The Soviet Union's 1979 nuclear test series was a group of 31 nuclear tests conducted in 1979. These tests  followed the 1978 Soviet nuclear tests series and preceded the 1980 Soviet nuclear tests series.

References

1979
1979 in the Soviet Union
1979 in military history
Explosions in 1979